A total lunar eclipse took place on Saturday, January 19, 1935.

Eclipse season 
This is the second eclipse this season.

First eclipse this season: partial solar eclipse of January 5, 1935 = last eclipse of Solar Saros 111

Third eclipse this season: partial solar eclipse of February 3, 1935 = sixteenth eclipse of Solar Saros 149

Visibility

Related lunar eclipses

Half-Saros cycle
A lunar eclipse will be preceded and followed by solar eclipses by 9 years and 5.5 days (a half saros). This lunar eclipse is related to two total solar eclipses of Solar Saros 130.

See also
List of lunar eclipses
List of 20th-century lunar eclipses

Notes

External links

1935-01
1935 in science
Central total lunar eclipses